Leevan Sands (born August 16, 1981 Nassau) is a Bahamian triple jumper.

His personal best jump is 17.59 metres, achieved in 2008 Olympic Games in Beijing. This is the current Bahamian record and won a bronze medal.  He also won bronze medals at the 2003 World Championships and 2002 Commonwealth Games.

He went to High School at Florida Air Academy
He was suspended from March 2006 to September 2006 for testing positive on the prohibited substance levomethamphetamine.

Sands competed for the Bahamas in the 2016 Summer Olympics in Rio de Janeiro, but he did not qualify for the finals. He was the flag bearer for the closing ceremonies.

Sands is the cousin of hurdler Shamar Sands who is also the Bahamian record holder in his event.

Sands was coached most of his professional career by Henry Rolle.

Achievements
2012 Olympic Games - fifth place
2008 Olympic Games - bronze medal
2007 Pan American Games - sixth place
2005 World Athletics Final - fifth place
2005 World Championships - fourth place
2010 World Athletics Final - sixth place
2012 World Athletics Final - seventh place
2003 World Championships - bronze medal
2002 Commonwealth Games - bronze medal
2002 World Junior Championships - fifth place

References

External links

1981 births
Living people
Bahamian male triple jumpers
Olympic athletes of the Bahamas
Athletes (track and field) at the 2004 Summer Olympics
Athletes (track and field) at the 2008 Summer Olympics
Athletes (track and field) at the 2012 Summer Olympics
Athletes (track and field) at the 2016 Summer Olympics
Medalists at the 2008 Summer Olympics
Olympic bronze medalists for the Bahamas
Doping cases in athletics
Bahamian sportspeople in doping cases
World Athletics Championships medalists
Athletes (track and field) at the 1999 Pan American Games
Athletes (track and field) at the 2003 Pan American Games
Athletes (track and field) at the 2007 Pan American Games
Athletes (track and field) at the 2015 Pan American Games
Pan American Games silver medalists for the Bahamas
Pan American Games medalists in athletics (track and field)
Commonwealth Games bronze medallists for the Bahamas
Athletes (track and field) at the 2002 Commonwealth Games
Athletes (track and field) at the 2014 Commonwealth Games
Commonwealth Games medallists in athletics
Sportspeople from Nassau, Bahamas
World Athletics Championships athletes for the Bahamas
Olympic bronze medalists in athletics (track and field)
Barton Cougars men's track and field athletes
Olympic male triple jumpers
Central American and Caribbean Games gold medalists for the Bahamas
Competitors at the 2010 Central American and Caribbean Games
Central American and Caribbean Games medalists in athletics
Medalists at the 2015 Pan American Games
Auburn Tigers men's track and field athletes
Auburn University alumni
Medallists at the 2002 Commonwealth Games